Allan Joseph Surtees (31 December 1924 – 1 November 2000) was an English actor who appeared in many television productions and films over a 30-year period.

Television appearances
His television appearances included roles on Coronation Street as councillor Ben Critchley, Bill Brand (1976), Rosie (1977–1979) as uncle Norman, Lovejoy, Brookside, Peak Practice, The Professionals, The Chinese Detective, Play of the Month, The Bill and The Brothers McGregor as Colwyn Stanley.

Film appearances
His film appearances include: Frankenstein Must Be Destroyed (1969), Eye of the Needle (1981) and Erik the Viking (1989).

References

External links

1924 births
2000 deaths
English male television actors
English male film actors
Male actors from Liverpool